Oliver Byrne (26 July 1944 in Dublin – 26 August 2007) was formerly the CEO of Irish soccer club Shelbourne F.C.

Early life
In 1949, when he was five, his brother Joe brought him to see Shelbourne at their former ground in Milltown. At the time his father Andrew was chairman and controlling shareholder of Shelbourne. He was chairman from 1945 to 1956.

Ollie attended St. Josephs BNS Primary School in Terenure. While studying for a degree in Law in UCD, he played for UCD AFC but his asthma ruled soccer out as a career choice. He left college to work in the music industry, promoting new acts, such as Thin Lizzy and Skid Row and had a club, Zeros, on Mary Street. However, he soon returned to football and became involved in the workings of Shelbourne F.C., the club he supported since he was a boy.

1977–1986
Byrne was inducted on to the Shels board in 1976. Tony Byrne took over the club in 1982 and it wasn't until 1986 that Ollie assumed control again.

An always controversial figure in 1976 Byrne left his stand seat in Tolka Park and smacked a referee who'd displeased him. The Football Association of Ireland suspended him for that for five years.

In January 1984, he sued Shelbourne Football Club Ltd for £21,000 Byrne had claimed he loaned the club. The following month Byrne was awarded £10,000 by the High Court.

In May 1986, Byrne sued the Evening Herald and the Evening Press for libel when the papers falsely accused Byrne and a co accused of firearms offenses.
In court, Byrne and a co accused were convicted of receiving stolen cigarettes and had been sentenced to three years at Shelton Abbey Prison. They were each awarded £2000.

2001
In September, he was involved in an incident with Derry City F.C. fans over a banner about former player Peter Hutton.

When the clubs played again in November the game was held up 35 minutes as Byrne argued over a clash of shirts.

2002
The Paul Marney affair saw Byrne and his club in the High Court when the players' "improper" registration for St. Patrick's Athletic ended in a court case which left the Inchicore club docked 15 points for further irregularities.

Byrne found himself back in court for a different matter when he was fined €100 for running a teenage disco in Tolka Park without a license.

2003
In March, Byrne was charged with public order offences after confronting St Patrick's Athletic fans.

2005
In May, Byrne wrongly accused Shamrock Rovers fans of orchestrating trouble at the 2005 Setanta Sports Cup Final

In June, he got involved in a fight with Roddy Collins.

In August, Byrne got involved in an altercation with the Drogheda United photographer.

2006
In November, a charge of assault against Byrne was struck out after Collins accepted his apology in court.

Death
Byrne was hospitalized in January 2007 for severe chest and head pains. He was hospitalized again in June 2007, which caused him to take a leave of absence as Chairman of Shelboune F.C., and died in August at age 63 from cancer.

References

External links
 "Never Ignored: Ollie's Reds" The incredible story of Ollie Byrne and Shelbourne F.C.

1946 births
2007 deaths
20th-century Irish criminals
Alumni of University College Dublin
Association footballers from County Dublin
Association footballers not categorized by position
Burials at Deans Grange Cemetery
Businesspeople from County Dublin
Criminals from Dublin (city)
Irish male criminals
Republic of Ireland football chairmen and investors
University College Dublin A.F.C. players